Antsakabary is a town and commune in Madagascar. It belongs to the district of Befandriana-Nord, which is a part of Sofia Region. The population of the commune was estimated to be approximately 22,000 in 2001 commune census.

Primary and junior level secondary education are available in town. Farming and raising livestock provides employment for 49% and 49% of the working population.  The most important crops are rice and vanilla; also coffee is an important agricultural product. Services provide employment for 2% of the population.

References and notes 

Populated places in Sofia Region